Caradrina vicina is a moth of the family Noctuidae. It was described by Staudinger in 1870. It is found from Central and Southeastern Europe, eastern and central Anatolia, and Western to Central Asia. The habitat consists of grasslands.

The wingspan is 23–28 mm. There is one generation per year with adults on wing from August to October.

Subspecies
Caradrina vicina vicina (southern European Russia, western Turkestan, northern Pakistan, Afghanistan, northern Iran, eastern Turkey)
Caradrina vicina castrensis Berio, 1981 (Italy)
Caradrina vicina hunza Hacker, 1992
Caradrina vicina rosea (Boursin, 1936) (Libya)

References

Moths described in 1870
Caradrinini
Moths of Europe
Moths of Asia
Moths of the Middle East